IIJ may refer to:

 The International Institute for Justice and the Rule of Law, an international political organization based in Malta
 International Institute for Journalism, an organization based in Berlin, Germany
 Internet Initiative Japan, Japan's first Internet service provider
 Indo-Iranian Journal, an academic journal
 An elite Texas-based secret society